National parks of Taiwan are protected spaces for the nature, wildlife, and history under their current jurisdiction. Currently there are nine national parks in Taiwan, all under the administration of the Ministry of the Interior. These national parks cover . The  total land area constitutes around 8.6% of the entire land area of the country.

The first national parks were designated for establishment in 1937, when Taiwan was under Japanese rule, though never formally managed as such. After World War II, calls for protecting the natural environment were met with opposition due to the prioritization of economic development. The National Park Law was passed in 1972 and the first national park was established in 1984.

National parks should not be confused with national scenic areas. The national scenic areas are administered by the Tourism Bureau of the Ministry of Transportation and Communications. There are also different philosophies that govern the development of the two types of areas. For a national park, the emphasis is on the preservation of natural and cultural resources, with development for human utilization being a secondary priority.

History
The first  in Taiwan were planned on December 27, 1937, by Governor-General . This was when Taiwan was under Japanese rule, thus the three national parks were to be national parks of the Empire of Japan.

The legal basis for these national parks was no longer in force when Japan withdrew from Taiwan in 1945 after World War II. However, these planned national parks formed the basis for subsequent national park establishments.

Current national parks of Taiwan
Currently there are nine national parks in Taiwan. There is also one national nature park, which is designed for areas with fewer resources compared to a full national park.

National Nature Park

Proposed national parks
Five other national parks were proposed but the plans of formation were halted due to opposition:
 馬告檜木國家公園 ("Makauy National Park for Chamaecyparis formosensis", opposed by local indigenous peoples)
 能丹國家公園("Neng-Dan National Park", opposed by the Bunun people)
 蘭嶼國家公園 ("Ponso no Tao National Park", opposed by the Tao people)
 綠島國家公園 ("Green Island National Park", opposed by the inhabitants.)
 北方三島海洋國家公園 ("Three Northern Islets Marine National Park")

Proposed national nature park
Another national nature park was proposed but the plans of formation were halted due to opposition:
 美濃國家自然公園 ("Meinong National Nature Park", opposed by some inhabitants.)

References

External links

 National Parks of Taiwan

 
Taiwan
Taiwan geography-related lists
National Parks
National parks